Steed was a shareware FTP client for Windows developed by French Fry.

Features
Steed allows users to transfer files using FTP and SFTP protocols and access their bucket and containers on S3 and Azure for storing data in the cloud. User bookmarks are kept in sync across multiple devices by using OneDrive or Dropbox. Steed's UI provides a native Windows experience, and provide features specific to the operating system, like Jumplist, tabbed thumbnails, and high DPI support. Steed has a tabbed interface in order to manage multiple connections. After a ten day trial period, the product must be purchased.

See also
 File Transfer Protocol
 Comparison of FTP client software

References 

Reviews
 Chris Dodds, Review: Steed, an attractive file transfer client for Windows, www.techerator.com 9, January 2013
 Mark Wilson, Steed: Everything You Need To Manage Your Online Files, windows.appstorm.net 3, December 2012

External links 
 Steed
 French Fry website
File_Transfer_Protocol
Shareware